The Turkish High Sculptors Society was founded on 22 April 1948.

Turkish sculptors were unable to or did not organise themselves together professionally for a long time until the Sculptors Society was founded in 1948 as Turkish Sculptors Society (Turkish: Türk Heykeltıraşlar Cemiyeti) by Ali Hadi Bara, Nusret Suman, Yavuz Görey, Kamil Sonat, Hüseyin Anka, Ratip Aşir, Kenan Yontuç, Turgut Pura, Hakkı Atamulu and Burhanettin Durupınar. In 1961 the name was changed to Turkish High Sculptors Society (Turkish: Türk Yüksek Heykeltıraşlar Cemiyeti). Through those years till at least 1974 the organisation continued to operate without being able to be recognised as a functioning and effective professional body according to some sources. Other sources have stated that the society has undoubtedly been a necessary organisation for the sculpture world and has become a large artists collective that has even brought forth an important exhibition (1968) with the efforts of İsmail Gökçe, who was the president of the society for some time. Muzaffer Doğan Ertoran was also the president for some time.

In 1988 it was re-established in a second period by Ali Teoman Germaner, Namık Denizhan, Tamer Başoğlu, Berika İpekbayrak, Meriç Hızal, Rahmi Aksungur, Şahabettin Köksal as the Sculptors Society (Turkish: Heykeltıraşlar Derneği).

The Turkish High Sculptors Society organises exhibitions every year, supporting sculpture and sculptors.

Known Members 

 Namık Denizhan
 Füsun Onur
 Gürdal Duyar
 Şadan Bezeyiş
 Nermin Sirel

Known Exhibitions 

 1968 Sculpture Exhibition, Municipal Art Gallery Taksim, 1968
 Türkiye Yüksek Heykeltraşlar Cemiyeti, Taksim Art Gallery, (16 October - ) 1969
 Türkiye Yüksek Heykeltraşlar Cemiyeti, Taksim Art Gallery, (9 January - 25 January) 1973

References

Sources 

Sculpture
Artist groups and collectives
Arts organizations established in 1948
Arts organizations established in 1988